Jake and the Never Land Pirates (also known as Captain Jake and the Never Land Pirates in the fourth season and associated merchandise) is an Annie Award-winning musical and interactive animated television series shown on Disney Junior. Based on Disney's Peter Pan franchise (itself based on the famous book and play by British author J.M. Barrie), this was the first Disney Junior original show following the switch from Playhouse Disney. It stars Sean Ryan Fox, Megan Richie, Jadon Sand, David Arquette, Corey Burton, Jeff Bennett, and Loren Hoskins. The titular character Captain Jake was previously voiced by Colin Ford, and then later by Cameron Boyce, and finally by Sean Ryan Fox, while Izzy was voiced for the first three seasons by Madison Pettis and Cubby was voiced by Jonathan Morgan Heit. The series is created by Disney veteran Bobs Gannaway, whose works include another Disney Junior series, Mickey Mouse Clubhouse, and films such as Secret of the Wings, The Pirate Fairy, and Planes: Fire & Rescue.

Series overview

Episodes

Season 1 (2011–12)

Season 2 (2012–13)

Season 3 (2014–15) 
On February 13, 2012, the same day Peter Pan Returns aired, the series was renewed for the third season. The third season premiered on January 3, 2014. The opening sequence of this series was changed.

Season 4 (2015–16) 
On January 8, 2014, Disney ordered a fourth season titled Captain Jake and the Never Land Pirates. According to The Animation Guild, I.A.T.S.E. Local 839, the fourth season would likely be the final season of the series. Like season 3 the opening sequence was changed, introducing new rhythm and images.

Shorts

Playing with Skully
This miniseries is a collection of shorts that center around the parrot character, Skully. <
Ship Ahoy! - 19 September 2012
Coconuts on Pirate Island - 19 September 2012
North Bound - 19 September 2012
Pirate Puzzle - 19 September 2012
Sailing the Never Sea - 19 September 2012
Diving in the Coral Reef - 19 September 2012
Where's Sandy - 22 September 2012
Pulley Hook - 23 September 2012

Jake's Never Land Pirate School
This miniseries is a collection of shorts that center around Jake and his crew teaching the viewers valuable pirate skills (the dates may be wrong because there are sources that say "Flying" aired on November 26, 2012).
Flying - 12 March 2012
Tic Toc Croc! - 12 March 2012
B-B-Big Bugs! - 12 March 2012
Go, Bucky!- 12 March 2012
Saving Captain Hook - 12 March 2012
Mama Hook Knows Best! - 29 October 2012
Dancing with Pirates - 27 February 2013
I've Got my Sword - 27 February 2013
Hop-Hop-Hop! - 27 February 2013
Look Out!- 4 March 2013

Jake's Buccaneer Blast
A miniseries based on these Jake and the Never Land Pirates Lego Duplo toys sometimes airs on Disney Junior to fill up space. Lego also hosts all these full videos for free viewing on YouTube.
The Golden Pirate Pyramid - 12 November 2014
The Treasure of Belch Mountain - 12 November 2014
Stormy Seas - 27 January 2015
The Big Golden Tiki Treasure! - 28 January 2015
Hideout Hijinks! - 27 February 2015
Pirates on Ice - 27 February 2015
The Never Land Jungle Speedway - 14 April 2015
The Never Land Pirate Pieces of Eight! - 28 April 2015

DJ Melodies
Do It
Together

References

External links
 

Lists of American children's animated television series episodes
Lists of Disney Channel television series episodes